Saut-Mathurine is a waterfall in Haiti located in Camp-Perrin, Sud. The source of its stream of water comes from the Rivière de Cavaillon.

References

Waterfalls of Haiti